The Crocolandia Foundation Inc., founded in 2001, is a nature conservation center located in Talisay City, Cebu, Philippines. The park houses birds, lizards, snakes, and crococodiles. The park also breeds endangered animals such as the Philippine crocodile and the sailfin lizard. The park's most famous resident is Lapu-Lapu, an estuarine crocodile. Other animals include civets, rufous hornbill,  ostrich, monitor lizards, myna, iguana, squirrel, turtles,  peacock, deer and a Visayan warty pig. The park also has a museum, a library, gardens, and fishponds. The park is the first of its kind in Central Visayas.

References

External links
TripAdvisor attraction review

Nature conservation organisations based in the Philippines
Organizations based in Cebu
Organizations established in 2001
Zoos in the Philippines
Talisay, Cebu
Buildings and structures in Cebu
Tourist attractions in Cebu
Zoos established in 2001